Heist-op-den-Berg is a municipality located in the Belgian province of Antwerp.

History
The 48-meter-high hill on which Heist would later be built (hence the adjunct name op-den-Berg meaning "on the hill") was formed during the early part of the Ice age.  As can be appreciated from the artifacts shown at the regional museum on the city's main square, this area was already populated in prehistoric times.  Soon after the Romans yielded this land to the invading Germanic peoples in the 3rd and 4th century, Christianization followed.  The village of Itegem, located right on the Nete River, was most likely the first hamlet to be founded, as suggested by a document dating from 976.  Chapels in Hallaar and Itegem were built in the 12th century.  This century also marked the beginnings of the Duchy of Brabant, of which this whole area was a part.

Around the year 1200, a military fort was built at the current location of the Ter Laken castle, on Booischot's territory.  Schriek, which was founded in 1125, got its own chapel in 1260 while the main church at Heist was built in 1340.  These two religious buildings were heavily damaged during the wars of religion around 1600.  During most of the Middle Ages, agriculture was driving the economy and several huge farming domains were built, some of which still subsist today (e.g., Wimpelhoeve in Wiekevorst, traces of which date from the 12th century, and Pandoerenhoeve in Schriek, dating from 1624).  During the 17th and 18th century, the miraculous wooden statue of the Virgin and Child in the Hallaar church became an object of pilgrimage.

The current city hall was built in 1844, fourteen years after the foundation of Belgium as an independent country.  Today, the city is mostly a residential centre, which offers services to the surrounding communities.

Events
Heistse Pijl, cycling race
Heist-op-den-Berg is well known for its Sunday morning flea market.

Sights

The historical heart of the city is the church square (Kerkplein), where one of the city's many old water pumps can be seen, and where a train museum (Treinmuseum) and a regional farming museum (Heemmuseum) can be visited.
An old windmill, the last one in the Mechelen area, churches and chapels, and farms, many with their original water pumps, dot the landscape around the city.
Heist-op-den-Berg (especially Itegem) also houses several castles, most of which are privately owned and therefore not open to the public.

Notable residents
Ivo van Hove, theatre director
Rik Torfs, Rector of the Katholieke Universiteit Leuven
Silvy De Bie, singer (b. 1981)
Leo Laurens (born 1952), former professional darts player 
Paul Michiels, singer and songwriter (b. 1948)
Filip Verlinden (born 1982), kickboxer
Anak Verhoeven, (born 1996), rock climber

See also
Heist-Goor
K.S.K. Heist

References

External links

Official city website 

 
Lordship of Mechelen
Municipalities of Antwerp Province
Populated places in Antwerp Province